Hatschekiidae is a family of copepods belonging to the order Siphonostomatoida.

Genera:
 Bassettithia Wilson, 1922
 Brachihatschekia Castro-Romero & Baeza-Kuroki, 1989
 Congericola Beneden, 1854
 Hatschekia Poche, 1902
 Laminohatschekia Boxshall, 1989
 Mihbaicola Uyeno, 2013
 Prohatschekia Nunes-Ruivo, 1954
 Pseudocongericola Yü, 1933
 Wynnowenia Boxshall, 1987

References

Copepods